Sea Fury is a 1929 adventure film directed by George Melford and starring Mildred Harris, George Regas and Frank Campeau. It was a transitional sound film, originally shot as a silent with some sound effects added later. It takes place on a ship travelling from Mexico to the United States who crew mutinies against the captain. On board is a young woman, the only survivor of a shipwreck.

Cast
 Jim Hallett as David Mills
 Mildred Harris as 	The Girl
 George Regas as 	Captain 
 Frank Campeau as Boatswain
 George Godfrey as 	Cook
 Bernard Siegel as Carpenter
 Monty O'Grady as Cabin Boy

References

Bibliography
 Munden, Kenneth White. The American Film Institute Catalog of Motion Pictures Produced in the United States, Part 1. University of California Press, 1997.

External links
 

1929 films
1929 adventure films
1920s English-language films
American adventure films
American black-and-white films
Films directed by George Melford
1920s American films